Stagecoach South East is the trading name of East Kent Road Car Company Limited, a bus operator based in Canterbury providing services in Kent and East Sussex in the south east of England. It is a subsidiary of Stagecoach Group.

History
Stagecoach have been operating in the Hastings area since their takeover of Hastings & District Transport in 1989. Stagecoach have made a vast amount of improvements to the Hastings bus network. All the improvements are in partnership with Hastings Borough Council and East Sussex County Council.

Acquisitions
East Kent Road Car Company
Stagecoach acquired the East Kent Road Car Company in 1993 and operates many routes with different route branding.

Eastbourne
In early November 2008, local press reported that Eastbourne Buses was to be sold by the end of the year to either the Go-Ahead Group or Stagecoach Group. The employees' trade union, Unite, wrote to Eastbourne Borough Council to ask the Council to sell to the Go-Ahead Group, because of work conditions and a superior fleet. On 25 November 2008, it was announced that Stagecoach was the preferred bidder to purchase. A few days later, it was announced in local press that the takeover had cost £4 million. Stagecoach had run services in the town until late in 2000 before they were withdrawn, and at the time of the announcement operated services to Hastings and Bexhill from Eastbourne.

The sale caused a lot of controversy, with MPs criticising the secrecy surrounding the sale and blaming each other's parties for the state the Eastbourne Buses got into, the Liberal Democrats claiming the Conservatives "failed to support Eastbourne Buses". There has also been criticism of the low price the company was sold at - revealed at £3.7 million, lower than the original report of 4 - and criticism against Stagecoach, one MP saying that the company has effectively been "given away for nothing". However, it was revealed that Go-Ahead had bid much lower at £2.85 million, so the council had to sell to Stagecoach to serve the taxpayer due to the £1.2 million difference in bids, despite the union's calls.

Cavendish Motor
In January 2009, Cavendish Motor Services were bought by Stagecoach Group. Stagecoach announced redundancies for Cavendish staff. The company was then merged with Eastbourne Buses and rebranded as Stagecoach.

On 13 May 2009, the Office of Fair Trading announced that it was referring the purchase of Eastbourne Buses and Cavendish Motor Services by Stagecoach to the Competition Commission. Although the provisional decision found that the acquisitions had substantially lessened competition, the Competition Commission cleared the purchase in October 2009 after deciding that Cavendish would have chosen either to reduce its services substantially or even to close its operations altogether following Stagecoach's acquisition of Eastbourne Buses.

Eastonways

Eastonways was an independent bus and coach operator providing regular bus services in and around Thanet, Kent in England.  The company's services, either fully or partly funded by Kent County Council, regularly operated in Margate, Westgate, Broadstairs, St Peters, Ramsgate and surrounding villages, Birchington, Acol, Manston, Minster & Monkton.  In March 2012, six of their buses were set alight at the company's depot in Ramsgate in an act of arson.  In October 2013, the company was placed in liquidation and most routes were taken over by Stagecoach on behalf of Kent County Council.

Until July 2017, Stagecoach operated National Express coach routes 007, 021, and 022, which were then taken over by The Kings Ferry. East Kent had operated services from Kent to Victoria Coach Station since 1932.

Fleet and Vehicles

Current fleet
As of 2022, the Stagecoach South East fleet consists of 442 buses.

The fleet consists of a mixture of Alexander Dennis Enviro400 (both integral and Scania N230UD versions), Alexander Dennis Enviro400 MMC (both integral and Scania N250UD versions), Scania OmniCity, Dennis Trident 2 Alexander ALX400, Alexander Dennis Enviro200, Alexander Dennis Enviro200 MMC, Alexander Dennis Enviro300, Dennis Dart Plaxton Pointer and Optare Solo buses.

Vehicle History
On 22 January 2012, 11 new Alexander Dennis Enviro400 bodied Scania N230UD's were introduced on The Wave 99 that runs between Hastings and Eastbourne via Bexhill and Pevensey Bay.

On 19 April 2012, 23 new Alexander Dennis Enviro200 Dart's were introduced on the local Hastings Arrow routes.

On 31 October 2014, a fleet of 10 new Scania N230UD Alexander Dennis Enviro400 buses were introduced to upgrade route 16 between Canterbury and Hythe to Stagecoach Gold operation.

In April and May 2016, a large fleet of new Scania N250UD Alexander Dennis Enviro400 MMC buses were introduced onto routes 8, 8A and 8X between Canterbury and Westwood Cross and onto the Triangle service between Canterbury and Herne Bay.

On 23 July 2016, Stagecoach South East introduced new open-top route 69 in Thanet, operating between Ramsgate and Broadstairs. Two TransBus Trident Alexander ALX400 buses were converted to open-top to operate the service.

On 5 December 2016, a fleet of 25 new Alexander Dennis Enviro400 MMC buses were introduced onto "Wave" routes 100, 101 and 102 between Hastings, Rye and Dover. A further fleet of 12 new Scania N250UD Alexander Dennis Enviro400 MMC buses entered service on "Wave" route 99 between Eastbourne and Hastings in January 2018.

In June 2019, a new fleet of 24 Alexander Dennis Enviro200 MMC buses were introduced onto the Thanet Loop service which operates in a circular route on the Isle of Thanet.

Routes

Local and Interurban Services
Stagecoach South East operate a mixture of local and interurban services across Kent and East Sussex. Bus services are centred in the towns of Canterbury, Ashford, Ramsgate, Folkestone, Hastings and Eastbourne.

The company also operates a number of high profile branded interurban services.

The Wave

"The Wave" is the brand given to services along the south east coast. The network is currently formed of four routes, which form a coastal corridor between Eastbourne and Dover:
 Route 99 runs between Eastbourne and Hastings via Bexhill-on-Sea
 Routes 100/101 runs between Hastings and Rye via either Icklesham or Fairlight
 Route 102 runs between Rye and Dover via Camber, Lydd, Littlestone-on-Sea, New Romney, Hythe and Folkestone

Services are generally operated using "Wave" branded Alexander Dennis Enviro400 MMC buses, although a number of these are currently being repainted into the new Stagecoach local livery.

Stagecoach Gold 16

Route 16 which operates between Canterbury and Hythe via Denton, Hawkinge and Folkestone is part of the premium Stagecoach Gold brand. Services are operated using Scania N230UD Alexander Dennis Enviro400 with free WiFi and leather seats. A number of these buses are currently being repainted into the new Stagecoach local livery.

The Breeze

Routes 8, 8A and 8X which operate between Canterbury and Westwood Cross via Birchington-on-Sea and Margate are branded as "The Breeze". 

Services are operated using "Breeze" branded Scania N250UD Alexander Dennis Enviro400 MMC buses although a number of these are currently being repainted into the new Stagecoach local livery.

Canterbury Park & Ride

Stagecoach South East also operate the Canterbury Park & Ride service on behalf of Canterbury City Council. 

Buses operate frequently from Canterbury City Centre to two park & ride sites, one at Wincheap and one at New Dover Road. Services from a third park & ride site at Sturry Road are currently suspended.

UniBus

Stagecoach South East operate the UniBus service, in partnership with The University of Kent. The network is formed of two routes, the Uni1 and Uni2 which connect Canterbury City Centre with the university campuses.

Depots
Stagecoach South East currently operate services from seven bus depots (and one outstation) across Kent and East Sussex:
 Herne Bay
 Ashford
 Westwood
 Folkestone
 Dover
 Hastings
 Eastbourne
 Old Romney (Outstation)

See also
 List of bus operators of the United Kingdom

References

External links
Stagecoach South East Website

Stagecoach Group bus operators in England
Companies based in Kent
Eastbourne
Bus operators in East Sussex
Bus operators in Kent